Josh Stevens (born Joshua Steven Gill, November 21, 1983) is an American singer, record producer, songwriter, audio engineer and music executive, located in Los Angeles. His works are Grammy Award winning, Emmy Award Winning, RIAA Platinum certified, Billboard Award nominated, Juno Award nominated, ARIA Music Awards Platinum certified and twice Superior Hit Product Award winner. He is currently the lead singer and co-executive producer of the super group LS+B alongside legendary hiphop producer Shafiq Husayn & Emmy Winning Composer Ikuma Matsuda. His early career was based around hip-hop and dance working for Warren G, Snoop Dogg, LMFAO, Pitbull, Steve Aoki, Jennifer Lopez, The Game and Clyde Carson. He however found his modern sound in future-funk, pop & indie-rock. As of 2019, he is also the musical voice of Sapporo Beer Chu-Hi 99.99 worldwide commercial campaign. In 2022, he was a music composer and songwriter for Lizzo’s reality show Watch Out For The Big Grrrls which won a Critics Choice Award for Best Competition Series and Emmy Award for Outstanding Competition Program.

Early years
His early years consisted of writing and free style rapping in his first hiphop group called Mental Advisory, where he went by the stage name Speratic. With his two brothers, Jason Whittaker (older) aka Blaximus and Jay Daniels (younger) aka M.A.R.S., Josh Stevens did mainly vocals at the time as Jason Whittaker did most of the production and music. One of Mental Advisory's biggest achievements was becoming the entrance music for comedian Mark Curry's live set. After the band members went on to do other ventures, Jason Whittaker became a well established comedian who now is known as Jay Whittaker. Jay Daniels became DJ Jason Craig. The members still work and make music with each other to this day.

Mental Advisory albums
Only The Few (2004)
Come Join The Circus – Speratic (solo album) (2008)

In 2004, Stevens attended the Los Angeles Recording School (now Los Angeles Film School) where he received a certificate of engineering. At this point he became an intern under Tom Weir at Studio City Sound. This is where he meet long time record executive, co-collaborator and current manager, Byron Martinez.  As of today Stevens still calls Studio City Sound in Studio City his main studio. At about the same time, he also became an intern for Niko Bolas. After spending about two years as an intern/assistant he found a live sound mix engineer position at Rick Warren's Saddleback Church. He spent just under two years as a head Tech Director. Wanting to get back into more studio work, he was asked to be a personal engineer for Warren G. Warren G was instrumental in Stevens working with LMFAO and they maintain a strong working relationship to the present day.

Career

Highlights

LS+B 
Josh is currently the lead singer and co-executive producer of the super group LS+B alongside Grammy Winning Music Producer/Artist Shafiq Husayn & Emmy Winning Composer Ikuma Matsuda. LS+B released Residency VIBE - Season 1 on September 15, 2021. The lead single Mercy featuring Jimetta Rose & Reuben Alexander debuted on Mi-Soul Radio in London, United Kingdom on September 20, 2021. Residency VIBE - Season 1 was a Grammy voted on and considered for the 2022 Recording Academy Song of the Year and Progressive R&B Album of the Year.

Sapporo 
In 2019, Stevens was sourced to sing and write the music for the worldwide commercial campaign of Sapporo beer new product Chu-Hi 99.99. The campaign resulted in 12 national TV commercial advertisements and giving him the title "The Voice of Sapporo 99.99". As of December 2019, Chu-Hi 99.99 is a twice Superior Hit Product Award Winner and has sold over 48,000,000 units with revenue of $72,000,000.

City of Mission Viejo 

On October 21, 2017 Josh was presented by the City of Mission Viejo, California to be the special Keynote Speaker for their annual Walk Against Drugs rally. The rally drew more than 4,000 attendees and is considered to be the cities highest acknowledgment from the city to civilian. It is their version of other cities "Key to the City Award". The keynote was introduced by then Major Wendy Bucknum

LMFAO 
Stevens co-wrote, engineered and toured on LMFAO's 2010 sophomore album Sorry for Party Rocking. They released the full album on June 17, 2011 in the U.S. It was certified gold in early 2012 and in 2013 was near platinum. The album's first single was "Party Rock Anthem" which spent six consecutive week on the US Billboard Top 100 at No. 1, and the video, which Stevens can be seen shuffling in, as of January 2019 had over 1.7 billion views. Billboard posted it at No. 2 for the biggest song of the 2010 decade. The song also peaked at No. 1 in Canada, the UK Singles Chart, and over ten other countries.

The second single was "Champagne Showers". It features English singer-songwriter Natalia Kills, for which Stevens was the recording engineer. The song was performed on American Idol in April 2012. The third single was "Sexy and I Know It", although Stevens was only accredited as writing the remix version (MADEin82 Remix). It reached No. 1 on the iTunes charts worldwide and No. 1 on the Australian and Canadian Hot 100. “Sexy and I Know It” also reached No. 5 in UK, plus No. 1 in Canada, Denmark, Ireland, Austria, Japan and New Zealand, and hit No. 1 on both Billboard R&B chart and the Billboard Hot 100.  The songs he had the biggest influences on for the album were co-writing and engineering "Reminds Me of You" featuring Calvin Harris and "With You".
 
Aside from writing and engineering for LMFAO's album, he also toured with them in 2011 as one of their DJs, monitor mix engineers and a traveling writer/music producer for Sky Blu's label Big Bad University.

Pitbull 
On June 17, 2011, Stevens engineered Pitbull's "Took My Love" (featuring RedFoo, Vein & David Rush) produced by Redfoo for Pitbull's sixth studio album, Planet Pit. The album debuted at No. 7 on the Billboard 200. It reached US (RIAA) Platinum and charted in the top 10 in over 10 countries.

Jennifer Lopez
On June 8, 2012, Stevens engineered and A&R (consulted) Jennifer Lopez's single "Goin' In", featuring Flo Rida and Lil Jon.  It was produced by Jamahl "GoonRock" Listenbee and released by Island Def Jam Records. The single reached No. 1 on US Billboard Dance Chart and the album which was released July 17, 2012 by Epic Records.

Steve Aoki 
Stevens co-wrote and engineered the song "Livin' My Love" featuring LMFAO and Nervo for Steve Aoki's January 10, 2012 album release, Wonderland.

Young Jeezy and Ne-Yo 
On February 21, 2012, Stevens engineered "Leave You Alone" by Young Jeezy featuring Ne-Yo and produced by Warren G. The song was RIAA platinum certified in October 2020.

Unaccredited works

Eminem and Rihanna 
In September 2013, while working as a consultant and writer for Interscope Records, Stevens was commissioned to submit songs for Eminem's The Marshall Mathers LP 2. This resulted in Eminem's "The Monster" ft Rihanna mixed by Dr. Dre and bearing a striking resemblance to one of  Stevens requested songs.

Present 
Stevens was on a world tour in support of his recent radio single "Somewhere", with 2019 tour stops in Japan and US.

Discography
 John Mayer – "Route 66" for Cars" (album) (2006)  
 Robin Ford – "Truth" (album) (2006) 
 Fabulous – "Mixtape" (single) (2006)
 Philip Bardowell – "Fall to Rise" (album) (2007)   
 Eric Lige – "Surrender" (album) (2008)    
 Speratic – "Come Join The Circus" (album) (2008)    
 LMFAO – "Sorry For Party Rocking" (album) (2011)   
 Gucci Mane – "Crush on You" (single) (2011)  
 Lil Jon – "Drink" (single) (2011)  
 Shwayze and Cisco Adler – "Drunk off Your Love" ft Sky Blu (single) (2011)  
 W.E.E.D (Shwayze, Sky Blu, Mark Rosas) – "Scrooge McDuck" (single) (2011)   
 Markey ft Josh Stevens  – "I Triumph" (single) (2011)  
 Clyde Carson ft The Game (Pro by Scoop DeVille) – "Something to Speak About" (single) (2011) 
 Pitbull – "Planet Pit" (album) (2011) 
 Josh Stevens – "Far Off Fantasy" (single) (2011)    
 Wiz Khalifa & Snoop Dogg – "Mac & Devin Go to High School (soundtrack)" (album) (2011)  
 Madonna - "Give Me All Your Luvin'" (Party Rock Remix) (featuring LMFAO and Nicki Minaj) (2012)  
 Steve Aoki – "Wonderland" (album) (2012)  
 E40 – "What Happened to Them Days" (single) (2012) 
 Enur with Nicki Minaj and Goonrock – "I'm That Chick" (single) (2012)  
 Jennifer Lopez ft Flo Rida and Lil Jon – "Goin' In" (single) (2012)  
 Young Jeezy – "TM:103 Hustlerz Ambition" (album) (2012) 
 Josh Stevens ft Lisa D'Amato – "Brighter Day" (single) (2012)    
 Josh Stevens – "Perfect Circle" (single) (2013)    
 Demi Lovato, Wilmer Valderrama, Columbus Short "Voto Latino Presents The Enforcers" (score) – (2012) 
 Warren G ft Nate Dogg and The Game – "Party We Will Throw" (single) (2012)
 Beenie Man ft Orisha Sound – "World War Three" (single) (2013) 
 Robin Thicke - "Blurred Lines" (Remix) (2013) 
 Fergie - A Little Party Never Killed Nobody (All We Got) The Great Gatsby Soundtrack (2013) 
 Sky Blu (rapper) (LMFAO) ft Wilmer Valderrama, Sensato del Patio – "Salud" (single) (2013) 
 David Boyles LMFAO – Party Rock Anthem Dub (remake) (single) (2013) 
 Suby Cheng – "If You Believe (Song of China)" (single) (2014)  
 Lisa D'Amato (America's Next Top Model Winner) – "Comfortably Dumb" (single) (2014)   
 Loren Smith – "Break Free" (single) (2014)  
 Naima Mora (America's Next Top Model Winner) – "Hour Glass" (single) (2014)  
 Warren G ft Nate Dogg - "My House" (2015) 
Warren G ft E-40, Too Short & Nate Dogg - "Saturday" (2015)
 Josh Stevens ft Spencer Ludwig - "Hill Top" (2015)

Notes
 signifies audio engineer
 signifies music producer
 signifies songwriter
 signifies composer
 signifies assistant audio engineer or intern
 signifies singer
 signifies A&R/Consultant

References

https://www.ocregister.com/2017/10/23/thousands-turn-out-for-mission-viejos-annual-walk-against-drugs/

https://r.search.yahoo.com/_ylt=AwrO_4QG58ZifJwJMN5x.9w4;_ylu=Y29sbwNncTEEcG9zAzEEdnRpZANDT0NPNENUUkxfMQRzZWMDc3I-/RV=2/RE=1657231238/RO=10/RU=https%3a%2f%2fcelebmix.com%2fanna-storm-makes-it-rain-with-songs-in-lizzos-new-hit-tv-show-watch-out-for-the-big-grrrls%2f/RK=2/RS=p9LdleFJNaNQlrWeq2LVaALsquw-

http://criticschoice.com/2022/06/the-winners-of-the-4th-annual-critics-choice-real-tv-awards/

https://finance.yahoo.com/news/niftymediaart-inks-groundbreaking-deal-toon-130000373.html

External links
 Josh Stevens Interview

1983 births
Living people
American male songwriters
Record producers from California
21st-century American singers
21st-century American male singers